Elam is a surname. Notable people with the surname include:

Charles Wheaton Elam (1866–1917), Louisiana politician
Joseph Barton Elam (1821–1885), U.S. representative from Louisiana's 4th congressional district
Jack Elam (1918–2003), American actor
James Elam (1918–1995), American physician
Jason Elam (born 1970), American football player
Kaiir Elam (born 2001), American football player
Katrina Elam (born 1983), American country music singer
Guru (rapper), stage name of Keith Elam (1961–2010), American rapper, one half of the duo Gang Starr
Lee Elam (born 1976), English footballer
Norah Elam (1878–1961), Irish-born suffragette and fascist
Onzy Elam (born 1964), American football player
Paul Elam, founder of A Voice for Men.